Rudolf Otepka (born 13 November 1973 is a Czech football player who plays as a midlefielder for Czech club Dynamo České Budějovice.

In October 2011, Otepka became the 11th player to play 400 matches in the Czech, and previously Czechoslovak top flight.

References

External links
 
 Guardian Football

Czech footballers
Czech First League players
1. FK Příbram players
FC Fastav Zlín players
FC Baník Ostrava players
SK Sigma Olomouc players
SK Dynamo České Budějovice players
1973 births
Living people
FK Drnovice players
Association football midfielders
FK Dukla Prague players
Sportspeople from Zlín